Amas Daniel (born 26 April 1990) is a Nigerian freestyle wrestler. At the 2016 Summer Olympics, he competed in the Men’s freestyle -65 kg.

In 2021, he competed at the 2021 African & Oceania Wrestling Olympic Qualification Tournament hoping to qualify for the 2020 Summer Olympics in Tokyo, Japan.

He competed in the men's 65 kg event at the 2022 Commonwealth Games held in Birmingham, England.

References

External links
 

Olympic wrestlers of Nigeria
1990 births
Wrestlers at the 2016 Summer Olympics
Living people
Wrestlers at the 2014 Commonwealth Games
Wrestlers at the 2022 Commonwealth Games
Commonwealth Games medallists in wrestling
Commonwealth Games bronze medallists for Nigeria
African Games gold medalists for Nigeria
African Games medalists in wrestling
Competitors at the 2015 African Games
Competitors at the 2019 African Games
African Wrestling Championships medalists
20th-century Nigerian people
21st-century Nigerian people
Medallists at the 2014 Commonwealth Games